Jacques Henri Emil van Meegeren (26 August 1912 – 26 October 1977) was a Dutch illustrator and painter.

He is also considered to be a forger of the work of his father, Han van Meegeren, convicted of forging old masters and fraud. He was, however, less gifted and his forgeries adversely affected the reputation of his father's work.

Life

Youth
Van Meegeren was born 26 August 1912 in the small village of Rijswijk, near The Hague, the Netherlands, four months after the marriage of his parents. His father was Han van Meegeren, who later became known as an art forger, while his mother was descended from an Indonesian royal family. In 1915, his sister Inez was born.

Van Meegeren adored his father and loved being allowed to go to his father's studio and help him by cleaning brushes and such. When he grew older, his father took him along to art dealers and museums, teaching him how to observe and assess paintings and other works of art. He soon began to sketch and draw, and demonstrated that he had talent for it.

Stay in Indonesia 
In 1923, his parents divorced. It is not certain whether Van Meegeren followed his mother to Paris at that time or remained in The Hague. It is known, however, that in 1927 he went with his mother and sister to Sumatra. They went to live there with his mother's family, who were directly related to the Sultan of Serdang. Van Meegeren attended the government Higher Civic School in nearby Medan, traveling every day in a steam train.

Choice of a profession
In 1930, when Van Meegeren turned 18, he returned from the East Indies. His father was happy to see his son and took him to his many friends, fellow-artists of The Hague Art Circle, painters and actors. They visited theatres and restaurants; for Jacques van Meegeren, it was a joyful introduction to the high life of The Hague where his father spent money freely.

Van Meegeren was warned by his father to not become an artist, as it was too uncertain a profession. Van Meegeren studied electrical engineering at the Sorbonne in Paris, though he continued to paint and draw as his father had done in his youth.

Paris

Student years
From 1931, Van Meegeren studied in Paris. He lived in an attractive studio on Boulevard Raspail and enjoyed an ample allowance from his father.

Van Meegeren received a letter from his cousins, the Prince Royal of Serdang and the Prince Royal of Deli, Sumatra. They came to visit the Colonial Exhibition in Paris featuring exotic temples and pavilions, with the Balinese-style pavilion of the Dutch East Indies being the finest of all. The princes asked van Meegeren to make up their daily program. During the day they had to pay official visits, but after these they changed into street clothing and their jewels were hidden in the hotel safe, but they still wore their velvet topies (Indonesian caps). In all the Parisian nightclubs the group frequented, Van Meegeren was seen as a kind of leader. The most attractive Parisian and foreign "vedettes" were nightly in their company. The French actress Mistinguett was besotted with the Prince Royal of Deli and followed him everywhere. The partying lasted a month.

Relationship with his father
After his studies ended, Van Meegeren worked for a period in the electro-technical industry, but a regular lifestyle did not suit him. He became a journalist and illustrator, and worked for Parisian magazines, while continuing to receive an allowance from his father.

Van Meegeren paid incidental visits to his father who lived at that time in Roquebrune, Southern France. In 1938, his father suggested that Van Meegeren should visit the exhibition of paintings of the Dutch Golden Age in Rotterdam, and have a special look at the newly discovered Supper at Emmaus by Vermeer. When his father later asked Van Meegeren about the impression the picture had made on him, Van Meegeren replied:

His father did not speak another word and Van Meegeren kept his father's secret. They did not discuss the matter again until 1945, when the fake came to light.

Marriage
On 22 September 1938, Van Meegeren married Lucienne Combey, a girl from Annecy near the Swiss border. Opposition by the family – especially by her father – was severe, but the couple persevered. They went to live in Paris at a better address than a starting journalist could afford, helped by his father, who had already earned much from his forgeries. In 1939, their daughter Michèle was born; and in 1942, their daughter Chantal.

During World War II, the couple lived in Paris until 1940. Van Meegeren traveled between Paris and the Netherlands which was remarkable during wartime. He also had a home in Amsterdam. Around the end of the war, Lucienne and their two children went to live with her parents in Annecy, as food had become scarce in Paris.

After the war, Van Meegeren traveled to the Netherlands to help his father, who had been arrested for his fraud with the Supper at Emmaus and other fake paintings. Van Meegeren didn't unite with his family in Annecy and had no money to help them out. He only wrote letters with vague plans and futile promises for money. In a sense he abandoned his family. After a while, Lucienne got tired of his promises and went her own way. She refused to divorce Van Meegeren, which later prevented him from marrying another woman.

A new career

Amsterdam
From 1946, Van Meegeren lived in Amsterdam in the house at the Amstel-quay, where he was registered since 1940. His father, however, didn't need much help; on the contrary, he helped his son to become a painter. When Han taught his son to paint portraits, he was a stern tutor, making him start over at any flaw. Han used to say: "What you have done once, you will do better next time." Van Meegeren became a capable portraitist and his father's best pupil. Van Meegeren's goal was to render the underlying character of a model in his paintings, particularly when children were concerned.

After two years waiting, his father's trial began in October 1947. Jacques van Meegeren attended the trial, as did as his sister Inez. It was an emotional experience for him. In the end, his father was sentenced to one year in prison, but soon after the verdict was delivered the elder Van Meegeren fell ill and was admitted to a private clinic in Amsterdam, where he died.

Van Meegeren made a drawing of his father lying in state in his home in Amsterdam, and delivered a brief eulogy at the funeral, ending with:  "Too many young artists think that skillful drawing and command of painting techniques are no longer necessary to become an honest artist. They would do well to take an example from my father."  As so often had happened with Han van Meegeren's words, this statement of his son was wrongly interpreted by one of the Netherlands' newspapers:  "Museum directors take care! The son of Han van Meegeren has said that artists today should use his father as an example."

Van Meegeren continued to paint and became successful. He received commissions for portraits all over the country and had exhibitions in several towns. He also went to Paris and worked as a scenery painter with the American Theatre and lead a bohemian life. In 1954, he met his estranged wife for the last time in Annecy, and made a portrait of his eldest daughter (age 15) but there followed no reconciliation.

France
Van Meegeren continued to live and work in Amsterdam and met his second partner in life: Juliette Ledel. In 1957, he traveled with her to Nice where he sold his father's villa. They bought a house in nearby Laghet, and settled there. Van Meegeren worked as a painter and portraitist and they both mixed with the local population and started to play pétanque, the popular sport of Southern France.

One of the commissions Van Meegeren obtained was the creation of a painted War Memorial, of which he was very proud. In 1959, the couple invested all their money and energy in a private exhibition of Jacques van Meegeren's work in Nice. However, a few days before the opening of the exhibition, Nice was flooded. No public came and no publicity was obtained; Van Meegeren suffered a mental depression which lasted several months.

Netherlands again
In 1962, Van Meegeren and Ledel returned to the Netherlands without any money. They were lured to Amsterdam by a plan for a Hollywood movie about his father. Van Meegeren was invited to take part in it and to consult the crew about the details of his father's life. However, the project was dropped and no movie was made. The couple was left without money, always changing their address and living in poorer circumstances.

Desperate for money, Van Meegeren started to paint and sell pictures with his father's signature which fetched far better prizes than his own work.

In the last year of his life he met a nurse – a Mrs. Van de Biggelaar – who had known him as a boy. He told her the story of his life and confessed that he had abandoned his wife and children. He also admitted that he had made fake pictures with the signature of his father.

A year later, in 1977, Jacques van Meegeren died, a poor and lonely man. Juliette Ledel was no longer with him, though it is not known whether she had left him or had died. His funeral was organized by a remote Indonesian cousin who happened to live in the Netherlands.

Fake Van Meegerens
Jacques van Meegeren was not the only one who faked his father's work. After Han van Meegeren had become known for his forgeries, his own work rose in price and it became worthwhile to fake his paintings. Many existing mediocre paintings got a signature "H. van Meegeren" and new pictures were made in his style.

Among these fakes, the imitations by Jacques van Meegeren are the most difficult to distinguish, as he painted in a style that was akin to his father's and was also able to produce a perfect fake signature. He sometimes authenticated their provenance by writing a certificate.

An interesting case in this respect is the collection of Carlos de Couto, the Brazilian vice-Consul in Amsterdam. He bought pictures directly from Han van Meegeren and also gave him a commission to paint a portrait of his wife. These pictures were entirely authentic Van Meegerens. He also bought some van Meegerens at auctions which might have been authentic as well. However, he later often lent money to Jacques van Meegeren who paid him back in pictures by "Han van Meegeren". There are good reasons to assume that many of these were made by Jacques van Meegeren and signed with an "authentic signature". The present owner of the collection is now left with the question which of these pictures are authentic and which are fakes.

The fake "Van Meegerens" made by Jacques van Meegeren and others are usually of low quality. They are, however, not always recognized as such and have thus adversely affected the reputation of Han van Meegeren's work.

Notes

Sources

 This is a biography of Han van Meegeren which also describes the life of Jacques in the chapters II to V and VIII, and his forgeries in chapter IX.
 It describes parts of Jacques' life; Lord Kilbracken was a friend of Jacques.

External links
  section "?Fake?" for pictures of forged van Meegerens.

1912 births
1977 deaths
20th-century Dutch painters
Art forgers
Dutch illustrators
Dutch male painters
People from Rijswijk
20th-century Dutch male artists